Tadhg Morley is an Irish Gaelic footballer who plays as a centre back at senior level for the Kerry county team.

Playing career

Underage
Morley played minor for Kerry in 2010 and 2011.

He played Under-21 for Kerry in 2012, 2013 and 2014.

Club
Morley plays for the Templenoe club who are situated just outside of Kenmare.

In 2015, he won Kerry and Munster Junior Club Football Championships and the All-Ireland Junior Championship in 2016. Morley won Kerry and Munster Intermediate Championships in 2019.

Kerry

2016–2021
Morley made his championship debut versus Clare in 2016.

He won five Munster Senior Football Championships and three National Football Leagues in his first six seasons on the Kerry county football team.

2022
Morley was one of just three Kerry players to start every League and Championship game in 2022.

He played in the 2022 All-Ireland Senior Football Championship Final and won his first All-Ireland against Galway on a scoreline of 0-20 to 0-16.

Morley was one of seven Kerry players included in The Sunday Game team of the year.

Personal life
Morley is a primary school teacher in Kenmare, having graduated from Marino Institute of Education.

Honours
Templenoe
Kerry Junior Football Championship: 
Winner (1): 2015
Munster Junior Club Football Championship: 
Winner (1): 2015
All-Ireland Junior Club Football Championship: 
Winner (1): 2016
Kerry Intermediate Football Championship:
Winner (1): 2019
Munster Intermediate Club Football Championship:
Winner (1): 2019

Kerry
All-Ireland Senior Football Championship: 
Winner (1): 2022
Munster Senior Football Championship: 
Winner (6): 2016, 2017, 2018, 2019, 2021, 2022
National Football League: 
Winner (4): 2017, 2020, 2021, 2022 
McGrath Cup: 
Winner (2): 2017, 2022

Individual
All Star: 
Winner (1): 2022
The Sunday Game Team of the Year:
Winner (1): 2022

References

1993 births
Living people
All Stars Awards winners (football)
Gaelic football backs
Irish schoolteachers
Kerry inter-county Gaelic footballers